The William Frederick Holmes House, also known as Theosa, is a historic Queen Anne-style house in McComb, Mississippi.  It was listed on the U.S. National Register of Historic Places in 2004.

History
In its NRHP nomination, it was asserted to be "one of the largest and most prominent examples of Victorian Queen Anne residential architecture in McComb, and is one of several noteworthy examples in Pike County."

References

Queen Anne architecture in Mississippi
National Register of Historic Places in Pike County, Mississippi
Houses on the National Register of Historic Places in Mississippi
Houses completed in 1894
McComb, Mississippi